Prisma Health Baptist Hospital (Formerly Baptist Medical Center and Palmetto Health Baptist Columbia) is a 489-bed acute-care facility located at the intersection of Taylor and Marion Streets in Downtown Columbia, South Carolina.  The hospital was established in 1914 as South Carolina Baptist Hospital by the South Carolina Baptist Convention after the widow of Dr. Augustus B. Knowlton, a prominent Columbia physician, asked the church to purchase the hospital, at that time a 70-bed facility on Marion St., that she and her husband started.  Over the years, the hospital expanded and grew as additional services were offered.  Baptist Columbia became part of the Baptist Healthcare System when a second Baptist hospital was built in Easley, South Carolina in 1958. In 1998, the two-hospital Baptist Healthcare System merged with Richland Memorial Hospital to form Palmetto Health, the largest healthcare system in South Carolina at the time. In 2017, Palmetto Health merged with the Greenville Hospital System to form Prisma Health and continues as the largest not-for profit hospital operator in South Carolina.

References

Prisma Health
Buildings and structures in Columbia, South Carolina
Teaching hospitals in South Carolina
Baptist hospitals in the United States
Hospitals established in 1914